Heliophila is a genus of flowering plants in the family Brassicaceae. Members of this genus are either annuals or perennials and some are popular as ornamental plants.  Endemic to southern Africa, the majority of the approximately 80 species grow in South Africa, particularly the Cape Floristic Region, while a few extend into the Namib Desert.

Taxonomic history
The first recognised published description of Heliophila appears in the second edition of Species Plantarum by Carl Linnaeus, printed in 1763.  He attributes his description, however, to Nicolaas Laurens Burman, a Dutch botanist. The generic name Heliophila is Latin but originally derived from the Ancient Greek words hēlios (ἥλιος), meaning "sun", and phílos (φίλος), meaning "dear" or "beloved", and refers to the blooms opening in sun and closing at night or in overcast conditions, a habit of many of the species within the genus.

In general, contention abounds regarding phylogenetic relationships in the family Brassicaceae.  In the past, using morphological characters to establish tribes and genera was misleading and created dissension among systematists.  The classification of species within Brassicaceae is gradually resolving through molecular phylogeny investigation, using internal transcribed spacer (ITS) data and other new-found sequencing knowledge.

Previously there were six genera within the tribe Heliophileae, all endemic to southern Africa: Heliophila, Cycloptychis, Schlechteri, Silicularia, Thlaspeocarpa, and Brachycarpaea.  The latter five genera contained among them only seven species, having been differentiated from the genus Heliophila mainly on morphological differences in the fruits they bore. Following extensive analysis of molecular evidence (nuclear (ITS) and plastid (trnL-F) DNA sequence data), Heliophileae was found to be monophyletic and the five small genera were reduced to synonymy with Heliophila.

Distribution
Heliophila is one of only two genera of Brassicaceae endemic to southern Africa.  The majority of the species grow in the winter-rainfall Cape Floristic Region and the more arid Namaqualand, while a smaller portion extend to the rest of South Africa, Namibia, Eswatini, and Lesotho.  None of the members of this genus are listed on the IUCN Red List of Threatened Species.

Description and habit
Heliophila is regarded as one of the most diverse genera in the family Brassicaceae.  Flower size, for example, varies greatly, with this genus containing both the largest of petals within the family (H. juncea) to the smallest (H. pectinata).  There is a range of flower colour, with blue, white, and pink being the most common.  Blue is an unusual colour for Brassicaceae, being known in only one other genus, the unrelated Solms-laubachia from the Himalayas.

Within the genus are mainly herbs and subshrubs, although shrubs and lianas appear as well.  They may be annual or perennial and the majority of the fruits produced by species in this genus are dehiscent, not woody, and lack a carpophore.  The plants are generally either glabrous or possess simple hairs.  Leaves are variable; they are narrow or broad, but usually simple, and may be entire, lobed, or pinnatipartite.  The inflorescences are usually the raceme type.

Species
Accepted species:
 Heliophila acuminata (Eckl. & Zeyh.) Steud, 1840
 Heliophila adpressa O.E. Schulz
 Heliophila affinis  Sond., 1846
 Heliophila africana (L.) Marais, 1970
 Heliophila alpina Marais
 Heliophila amplexicaulis L.f., 1782
 Heliophila arenaria Sond.
 Heliophila arenosa Schltr., 1899
 Heliophila brachycarpa Meisn., 1842
 Heliophila brassicaefolia Eckl. & Zeyh.
 Heliophila brassicifolia Eckl. & Zeyh.
 Heliophila bulbostyla Barnes
 Heliophila callosa (L.f.) DC., 1821
 Heliophila carnosa (Thunb.) Steud., 1840
 Heliophila cedarbergensis Marais
 Heliophila cinerea Marais, 1970
 Heliophila collina O.E. Schulz
 Heliophila concatenata Sond., 1846
 Heliophila cornellsbergia B.J. Pienaar & Nicholas
 Heliophila cornuta Sond., 1846
 Heliophila carnosa (Thunb.) Steud., 1840
 Heliophila coronopifolia L.
 Heliophila crithmifolia Willd., 1809
 Heliophila cuneata Marais
 Heliophila decurva Schltr., 1913
 Heliophila deserticola Schltr., 1913
 Heliophila diffusa (Thunb.) DC.
 Heliophila digitata L.f., 1782
 Heliophila dissecta Thunb.
 Heliophila dregeana Sond., 1846
 Heliophila elata Sond.
 Heliophila elongata DC.
 Heliophila ephemera P.A.Bean
 Heliophila esterhuyseniae Marais
 Heliophila eximia Marais
 Heliophila filicaulis Marais
 Heliophila formosa Hilliard & B.L.Burtt
 Heliophila gariepina Schltr.
 Heliophila glauca Burch. ex DC.
 Heliophila hurkana Al-Shehbaz & Mumm.
 Heliophila juncea (P.J.Bergius) Druce
 Heliophila katbergensis Marais
 Heliophila laciniata Marais
 Heliophila lactea Schltr.
 Heliophila leptophylla Schltr.
 Heliophila linearis DC.
 Heliophila linoides Schltr.
 Heliophila macowaniana Schltr.
 Heliophila macra Schltr.
 Heliophila macrosperma Burch. ex DC.
 Heliophila maraisiana Al-Shehbaz & Mumm.
 Heliophila meyeri Sond.
 Heliophila minima (Stephens) Marais
 Heliophila monosperma Al-Shehbaz & Mumm.
 Heliophila namaquana Bolus
 Heliophila namaquensis (Marais) Al-Shehbaz & Mumm.
 Heliophila nubigena Schltr.
 Heliophila obibensis Marais
 Heliophila patens Oliv.
 Heliophila pectinata Burch. ex DC.
 Heliophila pendula Willd.
 Heliophila pinnata L.f.
 Heliophila polygaloides Schltr.
 Heliophila promontorii Marais
 Heliophila pubescens Burch. ex Sond.
 Heliophila pusilla L.f.
 Heliophila ramosissima O.E.Schulz
 Heliophila refracta Sond.
 Heliophila remotiflora O.E.Schulz
 Heliophila rigidiuscula Sond.
 Heliophila rimicola Marais
 Heliophila scandens Harv.
 Heliophila schulzii Marais
 Heliophila scoparia Burch. ex DC.
 Heliophila seselifolia Burch. ex DC.
 Heliophila suavissima Burch. ex DC.
 Heliophila suborbicularis Al-Shehbaz & Mumm.
 Heliophila subulata Burch. ex DC.
 Heliophila tabularis Dod
 Heliophila thunbergii Steud.
 Heliophila tricuspidata Schltr.
 Heliophila trifurca Burch. ex DC.
 Heliophila tulbaghensis Schinz
 Heliophila variabilis Burch. ex DC.

References

Brassicaceae
Brassicaceae genera